Cecil Bradshaw (born 2 July 1928) was a Barbadian cricketer. He played in one first-class match for the Barbados cricket team in 1951/52.

See also
 List of Barbadian representative cricketers

References

External links
 

1928 births
Possibly living people
Barbadian cricketers
Barbados cricketers
People from Saint Joseph, Barbados